UM Specialist Centre (UMSC) has been in existence since 1998 in Lembah Pantai, Kuala Lumpur. It was initially established as an initiative by the Universiti Malaya (UM) and the Faculty of Medicine (FOM) to halt the “brain drain” of medical experts from public sector to the private. 

UMSC prides itself as the ‘Malaysia’s Premier Quaternary Hospital’ with a multidisciplinary of more than 270 specialists who among them are professor doctors with super and sub-specialists, to provide the highest quality of patient care.

UMSC has become the referral centre of tertiary hospitals where we are trusted to handle complex medical and surgical cases complemented by latest cutting edge technology with full and comprehensive expert personnel.

Brief History 
Established in 1998, UMSC was initially located at Universiti Malaya Medical Centre (UMMC) and in 2007 shifted to UMSC's own building. It is adjacent to the largest teaching hospital in Malaysia, UMMC and Malaysia's oldest medical school, the Faculty of Medicine, University of Malaya founded in 1962 which shares its roots with the National University of Singapore's Yong Loo Lin School of Medicine.

Malaysia's Premier Quaternary Hospital 
A center that offers subspecialty services and receives referrals from tertiary centers. UMSC bring focus on developing sub-specialty services – Consultants, nurses, equipment and supporting services, deliver care in teams to deal with complex medical problems as well as develop ties with national and regional centers.

Specialties 
UMSC offers more than 40 major specialties with sub-specialty services led and assisted by experienced medical doctors (mostly Professor doctors), nurses, pharmacists, physical therapists, dietitian, and other professional staff, providing patients with highly specialized care and advanced medical treatment for complex cases.

Quaternary Care 
Our quaternary care include:-

 Evidence-based Clinical & Surgical Management of Scoliosis]
 Minimally Invasive Video-Assisted Thoracoscopic Surgery (VATS)
 Paediatric Genetic Assay Profiling and Translation to Clinical Management
 Neurospine and Orthospine Cases with Image Guided and Minimally Invasive Therapy
 Anterior Skull Base Surgery and Neurotology
 Management of High Risk Pregnancy Expert and Evidence Based Care for Women with A High Risk Pregnancy
 Interventional Neuroradiology Management of Intracranial and Intraspinal Vascular Malformation
 Plastic Surgery – Reconstruction of Pathological Demolition
 Rehabilitation Medicine - The Advent and Utility of Robotic in Rehabilitation
 Breast Health: Evidence Based Minimally Invasive and Oncoplastic Breast Surgeries with Multidisciplinary Approach
 Endoscopic Resection of Early Gastric and Colon Cancer - Endoscopic Mucosal Resection (EMR), Endoscopic Submucosal Dissection (ESD)
 Prosthodontics – The Present and The Future / Dental Implants – The Final Frontier

Operations 
The hospital consists of 99 in-patient beds with 40 clinic rooms and four dental clinics. UMSC’s in-patient services and operating theatres are located at UMMC. Meanwhile, the Specialist Outpatient Clinics located at the UMSC Main Building provide other healthcare services which include Outpatient Clinics, Renal Care Unit, Day Surgery Unit, Radiology Services, Dietetic Consultancy and Pharmacy.

Cutting-Edge Technology 
Centre for Image Guided and Minimally Invasive Therapy (CIGMIT)

UMSC are equipped with the first and fully integrated intra operative imaging centre (CIGMIT) in Malaysia. combines highly-trained doctors with the latest in diagnostic imaging and medical software and systems for surgical navigation in an integrated operating theatre to enhance surgical outcomes and provide better care to the patients.

The hybrid operating theatres of CIGMIT integrate CT and MRI scanners, providing surgeons with highly precise and up-to-date information. CIGMIT consists of two hybrid operating theatres complemented with a radio surgery centre; forming a comprehensive integrated facility.

List of Awards & Recognitions 

 The BrandLaureate Awards (Brand of The Year - Tertiary Medical Centre, Integrated Healthcare Support, 2021-2022)
 Talentbank Graduate Choice Awards 2022 (Graduates Choice of Employer - Top 10 in Healthcare, Hospital)

See also 
 University Malaya Medical Centre
 University of Malaya
 List of medical schools in Malaysia
 List of university hospitals

References

External links 
 

University of Malaya
1998 establishments in Malaysia
Hospitals established in 1998
Hospitals in Kuala Lumpur